The Red Bug, later marketed as the Auto Red Bug were a vintage era cyclecar automobile manufactured by the Automotive Electric Service Corp. of North Bergen, New Jersey from 1924 to 1930.  It is considered an early version of a microcar.

History 
A. O. Smith developed the Smith Flyer with a fifth wheel, called the Smith Motor Wheel, driven by a gas engine. Manufactured in Lafayette, Indiana, by the American Motor Vehicle Company, from 1916 to 1919,   A. O. Smith sold the rights to Briggs & Stratton who marketed the cyclecar as The Briggs & Stratton Flyer.  

Briggs & Stratton sold the rights to the Flyer and Briggs & Stratton Motor Wheel to Automotive Electric Service Corp. in 1924 who continued to build it as the Red Bug.  When the supply of gasoline engines ran low, a 12 volt electric version was produced.  The electric version was built with four wheels, with one rear wheel driven by a Northeast electric motor, the same motor used for starting on contemporary Dodge Brothers automobiles.  

Red Bugs and Auto Red Bugs were sold by Abercrombie & Fitch and others in the United States, as well as the United Kingdom and France. Priced at $150 from 1924, the small automobiles sold mostly as a novelty for the wealthy, but also for transportation within resorts and at amusement parks. 

In 1930 there were reports that Indian Motorcycle Company would take over production of the Red Bug, but this did not occur since Indian itself was acquired by the duPonts.

External links
 History of the Red Bug Car
 Jekyll Island History - Red Bug 
 Silodrome.com Auto Red Bug article
 Auto Red Bug at Heritage Museum and Gardens
 1924 Red Bug sold at Sotheby's Auction
 Unusual 1924 Red Bug at the Lane Museum

References

Electric vehicle manufacturers of the United States
Defunct motor vehicle manufacturers of the United States
Motor vehicle manufacturers based in New Jersey
Electric vehicles
Vintage vehicles
1920s cars
Cyclecars
Microcars
Cars introduced in 1924